State Route 302 (SR 302) is an east–west route located entirely in Coffee County in southeastern Alabama. The entire route goes by the street name West McKinnon Street.

Route description 
SR 302 is part of the old alignment of U.S. Route 84 (US 84) in the New Brockton area. It begins at a junction with the new bypass alignment of US 84 on the west side, and it ends at a junction with SR 122 in the town's downtown core. The remaining parts of SR 122 going southeast is also a part of the old US 84 in New Brockton.

History
The SR 302 designation was established in 2016 when US 84 was re-routed onto an alignment that bypasses the town of New Brockton.

Major intersections

References

External links

302 
302 
U.S. Route 84